Events from the year 1811 in France.

Incumbents
 Emperor – Napoleon I

Events
19 February – Peninsular War: Battle of the Gebora, French routed Spanish forces.
5 March – Peninsular War: Battle of Barrosa, tactical defeat for French.
13 March – Napoleonic Wars: Battle of Lissa, a British naval victory.
25 March – The Great Comet of 1811 is discovered by Honoré Flaugergues.
3 April – Peninsular War: Battle of Sabugal, Anglo-Portuguese victory.
14 April – Peninsular War: Siege of Almeida; siege of French garrison begins.
3 May–5 May – Peninsular War: Battle of Fuentes de Oñoro, Anglo-Portuguese victory, preventing French relief of the siege of Almeida.
10 May – Peninsular War: Siege of Almeida ends with escape of French garrison.
16 May – Peninsular War: Battle of Albuera, an indecisive battle.
25 May – Peninsular War: Battle of Usagre, Anglo-Portuguese victory.
25 September- Peninsular War: Battle of El Boden, French victory.
28 October – Peninsular War: Battle of Arroyo dos Molinos, Anglo-Portuguese victory over French forces.

Births
18 January – Édouard René de Laboulaye, jurist (died 1883)
19 February – Jules Sandeau, novelist (died 1883)
11 March – Urbain Le Verrier, mathematician (died 1877)
20 March – Napoleon II, son of Napoleon Bonaparte (died 1832)
17 August – Alfred-Henri-Amand Mame, printer and publisher (died 1893)
23 August – Auguste Bravais, physicist (died 1863)
30 August – Théophile Gautier, poet, novelist, journalist, dramatist and literary critic (died 1872)
25 October – Évariste Galois, mathematician (died 1832)
29 October – Louis Blanc, politician and historian (died 1882)
30 October – Auguste-François Maunoury, Hellenist and exegete (died 1898)
11 November – François Delsarte, musician and teacher (died 1871)
15 November – Jacques-Maurice De Saint Palais, Archbishop of Indianapolis (died 1877)
5 December – Arthur-Marie Le Hir, Biblical scholar and Orientalist (died 1868)

Full date unknown
Auguste Casimir-Perier, diplomat (died 1876)
Henri Delaborde, art critic and painter (died 1899)
Philippe Édouard Foucaux, Tibetologist (died 1894)

Deaths
10 January – Joseph Chénier, poet, dramatist and politician (born 1764)
27 January – Jean-Baptiste Huet, painter, engraver and designer (born 1745)
13 March – Bernard Dubourdieu, Rear Admiral (born 1773)
28 April – Jacques-André Emery, Superior of the Society of St-Sulpice (born 1732)
15 May – François Amable Ruffin, General (born 1771)
16 May – François Werlé
 12 March – Frederik Christian Winsløw, medal engraver (1852 1852)
23 June – Jean-André Valletaux
19 July – Raphaël Bienvenu Sabatier, anatomist and surgeon (born 1732)
20 August – Louis Antoine de Bougainville, navigator and military commander (born 1729)
27 October – Nicolas Godinot, General (born 1765)
17 December – Louis Abel Beffroy de Reigny, dramatist (born 1757)

Full date unknown
Jean-Simon Berthélemy, painter (born 1743)
Jean-Baptiste Pussin, hospital superintendent (born 1746)
Jean-Baptiste Réveillon, paper manufacturer (born 1725)

See also

References

1810s in France